The siege of Lille (12 August – 10 December 1708) was the salient operation of the 1708 campaign season during the War of the Spanish Succession. After an obstinate defence of 120 days, the French garrison surrendered the city and citadel of Lille, commanded by Marshal Boufflers, to the forces of the Duke of Marlborough and Prince Eugene.

The siege was famous among contemporaries for l'affaire des poudres ("the gunpowder incident"), where the Chevalier de Luxembourg with 2,000 horsemen passed through the Allied lines and succeeded in delivering 40,000 pounds of desperately needed gunpowder to the defenders.

The siege was made possible by the defeat of the French army at the Battle of Oudenarde and the landing in Ostend of large amounts of ammunition and food after the Battle of Wijnendale. For most of the campaign, Eugene commanded the forces besieging Lille, while Marlborough commanded the forces covering those forces against external French interference. For a short period in late September however, after Eugene was injured on the 21st, Marlborough took command of both the besiegers and the covering force.

On 22 October the Allies entered the city at the staggering cost of 12,000 casualties; Boufflers continued to resist from Lille's citadel for several weeks, exacting an additional 4,000 allied casualties. While the allies' deft manoeuvring frustrated French attempts to relieve their precious fortress—the last substantial French bastion in northern Flanders—Boufflers' valiant defence likewise prolonged the siege well into winter, to the point where no operations could be undertaken against France that year. The French garrison of Lille capitulated on 10 December and the remaining defenders marched out with full honours of war, and Boufflers was decorated by Louis XIV.

For France, the results of the siege were mixed. The city's stubborn defence tied down Marlborough for the remainder of the 1708 campaigning season, preventing him from inflicting further damage on France in the aftermath of Oudenarde. But, with the loss of Lille, northern Flanders reverted to allied control; the Allies moved against Ghent, taking the city in late December. The fall of Lille also opened a corridor for an allied invasion of France in 1709, but this effort would run into a bloody standstill at the Battle of Malplaquet.

Gallery

References

Notes

Citations

Bibliography
 
 

 Lynn, John A. The Wars of Louis XIV, 1667–1714. Longman, (1999).

External links
 The siege of Lille 1708

Battles of the War of the Spanish Succession
Sieges involving France
Sieges involving Great Britain
Siege of Lille (1708)
1708 in France
History of Lille
Sieges of the War of the Spanish Succession
Battles in Hauts-de-France
Sieges involving the Dutch Republic